This following is a list of all professional and volunteer-professional combination fire departments within Texas. These departments are regulated by the Texas Commission on Fire Protection.

References

 
Texas
fire departments

Graham Fire Department 
11